Over is a village in the municipality of Seevetal in Lower Saxony, Germany with about 1,400 citizens. In 1972, Over and 18 other municipalities were assembled to form the new municipality of Seevetal.

Geography 

Over lies south of the river Elbe. In Over, the river Seeve flows into the Elbe. A part of the natural reserve Untere Seeveniederung lies in Over.

Sports 
The sports club TSV Over-Bullenhausen was founded in 1931. Among its activities are soccer, tennis and swimming. Over has a public indoor swimming pool.

Villages in Lower Saxony